Mathilde Larrère, born in Paris (19 October 1970) is a French historian. She is a specialist in revolutionary movements and policing in 19th century France.

Biography

Background and training 
She is the daughter of Raphaël Larrère, an agricultural engineer, and Catherine Larrère, a philosopher. She won the agrégation d'histoire in 1994. She was awarded a PhD in history (2000) on defending her thesis, "The Paris National Guard under the July Monarchy, power at the end of the rifle?", completed under the direction of Alain Corbin. She has also taken courses as an auditor at the École pratique des hautes études.

Career 
Her research focuses on the history of citizenship, the history of the relationship between citizens and the state, the history of policing, and more particularly on the history of the July revolution in 1830. Larrère volunteered in the Paris national guard, a unit of the National Guard (France) in charge of local public order. Finding herself on both sides of the barricades depending on events, she was prompted to reflect on public order, on the policies for maintaining it, in a politically troubled and socially agitated context - a task which also led her to reflect on public "disorder". Used by both the government and the opposition, the national guard seems to her to be a good observatory of citizenship lived by people. She researches this via political uses of the Parisian space in the 19th century. In 2017 and 2018, she was a columnist on the websites Arrêt sur images and Mediapart co-writing a column entitled "" with Laurence De Cock.

She asserts a politicised approach to history, saying: "You don't say false things because you have a politicised approach, as long as you are scientifically sound and don't betray the sources. I'm showing my colours." ("").

She also rejects the concept of neutrality in history: "To say that history is neutral is a great scam to pass off right-wing history" ("). She was a member of the Comité de vigilance face aux usages publics de l'histoire (CVUH). The CVUH is an association of historians founded to monitor the public use of history for collective memory purposes, particularly by politicians. 

She joined the social network Twitter in 2013, where she posts historical ephemera in the form of "mini-courses". and gained notoriety by criticising some of Manuel Valls' positions, Nicolas Sarkozy, François Fillon, Jean-Luc Mélenchon and Emmanuel Macron concerning various aspects of French history such as colonisation or the Ordinance of Villers-Cotterêts.

Politics and trade unions 
Mathilde Larrère joined the Left Party in 2012. During the 2014 municipal elections in Paris, she was a candidate on the Left Party list of the 12th arrondissement. She left the party in January 2016, after "political disagreements".

She co-founded a collective that wanted to renew the left, Le Temps des Lilas, and participated in the Nuit debout movement.

She is a member of the lecturer's branch of the left-wing public officials' union, FSU (Fédération Syndicale Unitaire), SNESUP-FSU.

She was one of the first signatories calling for the demonstration against Islamophobia on 10 November 2019.

In the 2022 presidential election, she supported Jean-Luc Mélenchon, then indicated that she would vote against Marine Le Pen in the second round. In May 2022, she joined the parliament of the New Ecological and Social People's Union.

Publications 

 2013 . (Director of publication) ISBN 978-2-7011-6275-1
 2016 . ISBN 978-2-13-062168-3
 2018  (with Aude Lorriaux) ISBN 979-10-97079-28-4
 2019  (with Laurence de Cock and Guillaume Mazeau) ISBN 978-2-7489-0395-9
 2019  ISBN 979-10-97079-46-8
 2020  (with Laurence de Cock) ISBN 978-2-7082-4619-5
 2021 Rage against the machisme ISBN 979-10-97079-63-5

Documentary interviews 

 2017  (Laurent Turcot)
 2019 Nota Bonus (1 episode)
 2019  (dir. Jonathan Duong)
 2020 The Monopoly of Violence

Références 

Living people
1970 births
Left Party (France) politicians
French women in politics
21st-century French historians